Bay of Plenty (often known as the Bay of Plenty Steamers) are a New Zealand professional rugby union team based in Mount Maunganui, New Zealand.  The union was originally established in 1911, with the National Provincial Championship established in 1976. They now play in the reformed National Provincial Championship competition. They play their home games at Rotorua International Stadium in Rotorua or Tauranga Domain, Tauranga, both in the Bay of Plenty Region. The team is affiliated with the Chiefs Super Rugby franchise. Their home playing colours are blue and yellow.

Current squad

The Bay of Plenty Steamers squad for the 2022 Bunnings NPC is:

Honours

Bay of Plenty have been overall Champions on 1 occasion, winning the inaugural title in 1976. Their full list of honours include:

National Provincial Championship First Division
 Winners: 1976

National Provincial Championship Second Division North Island
 Winners: 1978

National Provincial Championship Second Division
 Winners: 2000

Mitre 10 Cup Championship Division
 Winners: 2019

Current Super Rugby players
Players named in the 2022 Bay of Plenty Steamers squad, who also earned contracts or were named in a squad for any side participating in the 2022 Super Rugby Pacific season.

References

External links
Official Site
BOP Mafia – Supporters Club

National Provincial Championship
New Zealand rugby union teams
Sport in the Bay of Plenty Region